Richard Spencer (died 1414) was the member of the Parliament of England for Salisbury for multiple parliaments from 1395 to 1411. He was also coroner and mayor of Salisbury.

References

External links 

Members of Parliament for Salisbury
English MPs 1395
English MPs January 1397
Year of birth unknown
1414 deaths
Mayors of Salisbury
British coroners
English MPs 1401
English MPs 1411